Bohumil Laušman (30 August 1903, Žumberk, Kingdom of Bohemia – 9 May 1963, Prague) was a Czech Social Democratic politician.

During World War II he was in exile in Great Britain, where he was a member of the Czechoslovak government in exile. He returned after the war and was Minister of Industry from 1945 until he was elected chairman of the Social Democratic party in 1947. In 1949 he went to exile again - via Yugoslavia to Austria.

He was kidnapped from exile in Austria by the Czech StB in 1953, imprisoned in Czechoslovakia and died "in unclear circumstances" in Ruzyně Prison in Prague in 1963.

References
"The Man Between", Time, Monday, May. 31, 1954.
"History of the Ministry of Industry and Trade", official webpage.

1903 births
1963 deaths
People from Žumberk
People from the Kingdom of Bohemia
Leaders of the Czech Social Democratic Party
National Labour Party (1938) politicians
Government ministers of Czechoslovakia
Members of the Chamber of Deputies of Czechoslovakia (1935–1939)
Members of the Interim National Assembly of Czechoslovakia
Members of the Constituent National Assembly of Czechoslovakia
Czech people of World War II
World War II political leaders
Czechoslovak exiles
Czechoslovak people who died in prison custody
Prisoners who died in Czechoslovak detention